Majestic Fanfare is a short orchestral piece of music written by the British composer Charles Williams in 1935. It is well recognized as the theme to ABC news broadcasts in Australia. Currently, it is being used on ABC NewsRadio, usually at the top of every hour.

1943 version

Majestic Fanfare was first recorded in 1943 by the Queen's Hall Light Orchestra conducted by the composer.

In an abridged form, it came to prominence in Australia, initially as the signature tune for radio broadcasts of proceedings from the Parliament of Australia, and subsequently as the signature tune for radio and television news broadcasts by the Australian Broadcasting Commission (ABC). It was first used for this purpose on 1 January 1952 until 1982, when it was replaced with a different version.

Majestic Fanfare replaced a short version of Advance Australia Fair that had been in use throughout World War II. Further shortening of what was already regarded as a significant national song (it would become Australia's official national anthem in 1984) was regarded as somewhat sacrilegious, while shortening the apolitical Majestic Fanfare was deemed less contentious.

1982 version

On television, Majestic Fanfare was updated in 1982 to celebrate the ABC's 50th anniversary, using synthesizers. This version was used as the ABC News theme. It was tuned a semitone higher, to E major.

1988 version

In 1988, in accordance with the recommendation, and also to help celebrate the Australian Bicentenary, the ABC commissioned the Australian composer Richard Mills to re-orchestrate the tune in a more modern, Australian idiom. His arrangement was recorded by the Sydney Symphony Orchestra under Stuart Challender, at the Sydney Opera House. In the early 2000s, Mills' original pencil-written manuscript for the full and two abridged versions of the theme was donated to the music library of the University of Melbourne.

The theme is still used for ABC Radio news bulletins. Originally it was planned that Armiger's 2005 theme (below) would replace Majestic Fanfare on radio bulletins as well, but the plan did not proceed. A radio news inquiry later that year recommended that Majestic Fanfare should be either replaced or updated.

The piece, as used by the ABC, exists in two formats: an 18-second version that was used for many years, and a 9-second abridged version that was usually used thereafter (although the 18-second version is still played on regional radio and on extended bulletins, such as the daily 7.45am Local Radio bulletins).

Other ABC News themes

In 1985, when ABC's evening news bulletin was replaced by The National, Majestic Fanfare was replaced by Alan Hawkshaw's Best Endeavours, then also used by Britain's Channel 4 News bulletins.

In 1985, when ABC News was relaunched, Majestic Fanfare did not return. Since then, two Australian-composed tunes have been used. The first titled ABC News theme was written in 1985 by Sydney composers Tony Ansell and Peter Wall. It was used for 19 years. The original version of the current ABC News theme, composed by Martin Armiger and introduced on Australia Day 2005, incorporates some prominent elements of the original Majestic Fanfare. A revised version of the theme was introduced in 2010, and another in 2017.

In 1991, Paul McKercher and John Jacobs, audio engineers at the ABC-owned Triple J radio station, composed a remix of the original 1943 recording, using elements from NWA's Fuck tha Police and Prince's Gett Off, which has been used to introduce the station's news bulletins since.

References

External links
 Majestic Fanfare at Australian Screen Online; includes the 1943 recording by the Queen's Hall Light Orchestra.
 A Sixth Garland of British Music, MusicWeb International; contains a brief biography of Charles Williams and the use of Majestic Fanfare.

ABC News and Current Affairs
Compositions by Charles Williams
1935 compositions
Radio theme songs
Television news music packages